Pleckstrin-2 is a protein that in humans is encoded by the PLEK2 gene. The PLEK2 gene is located on chromosome 14 in Homo sapiens and is flanked by TMEM229B to its right and ATP6V1D to its left.

References

Further reading